Annita Pania (born Anastasia Pania, 25 April 1970) is a Greek television hostess.

Before presenting her first dating show, "To Hrisso Koufeto" ("The Golden Sugarplum"), she was a teacher of French language and a songwriter.

Biography
She is married to composer-songwriter Nikos Karvelas, who provided a steady stream of songs for the "talents" of her TV show, "Je t'Aime". Recent underground hits include "To 'ho Anagi Poly" ("I need it desperately") and "Sex, Gardoumpa kai doner", the latter being a hymn to unrequited love and eating banquets.

On 1 January 2008, she gave birth to a son. In November 2008, Pania and Karvelas were arrested by the police after a police chase, which started off with them running a red light. The incident supposedly started when the car driven by Karvelas ran a red light. Police then began to chase them and turned their sirens on to pull them over. Karvelas continued on, running further red lights and driving erratically. Pania and Karvelas allege that they were listening to a new song that Karvelas wrote, with the volume up high, did not hear any sirens and were not aware of any police chasing them. They also deny ever running the red light.

Later, the couple claimed that the policemen not only were overzealous, commanding and rude (using the word "re") but also threatened them with their weapons. Pania also mentioned later on TV that she does respect the police, but on the other hand the couple would not comply to bullies, "cops" and "baskines" (pejorative word signifying policemen with improper attitude), whose insulting behavior rather reminded of the Greek Junta. The couple vowed to take the subject up in court.

Pania and Karvelas were later charged in court, found guilty and sentenced to 14 and 10 months in jail respectively, though they were allowed to buy out their sentences.

She has released a book, "I Ekdikissi tou Kolohartou" ("The Revenge of the Toilet Paper," ).

Filmography

Television

References

External links
  homepage
 
 Η εκδίκηση του κωλόχαρτου at ''The Greek Shop
Article about Pania's and Karvelas' adventure

1970 births
Living people
Greek schoolteachers
Greek songwriters
Greek television presenters
Greek women television presenters
21st-century Greek educators
21st-century Greek musicians
Mass media people from Athens